The 2020–22 Asian Development Tour was the 10th season of the Asian Development Tour, a second-tier tour operated by the Asian Tour. The season began at the Boonchu Ruangkit Championship in Thailand in January 2020. 

After a two-year break due to COVID-19 pandemic, the tour resumed playing in March 2022 at the Gurugram Challenge in India. Later, the tour announced the "Beautiful Thailand Swing", four three-day events in Phuket jointly-sanctioned by the MENA Tour, which were played in May 2022.

Schedule
The following table lists official events during the 2020–22 season.

Order of Merit
The Order of Merit was based on prize money won during the season, calculated in U.S. dollars. The top 10 players on the tour earned status to play on the 2023 Asian Tour.

Notes

References

2020-22
2020 in golf
2022 in golf
2020 in Asian sport
2022 in Asian sport